This is a list of the main career statistics of Norwegian professional tennis player Casper Ruud. All statistics are according to the ATP World Tour and ITF websites.

Performance timelines

Singles
Current through the 2023 Indian Wells Masters.
{| class="wikitable nowrap" style="text-align:center;font-size:97%;"
!Tournament!!2015!!2016!!2017!!2018!!2019!!2020!!2021!!2022!!2023!!SR!!W–L!!Win %
|-
|colspan=12 style=text-align:left|Grand Slam tournaments
|-
|style=text-align:left;background:#efefef|Australian Open
|A
|A
|Q3
|bgcolor=afeeee|2R
|Q1
|bgcolor=afeeee|1R
|bgcolor=afeeee|4R
|A
|bgcolor=afeeee|2R
|bgcolor=efefef|0 / 4
|bgcolor=efefef|5–4
|bgcolor=efefef|
|-
|style=text-align:left;background:#efefef|French Open
|A
|A
|Q2
|bgcolor=afeeee|2R
|bgcolor=afeeee|3R
|bgcolor=afeeee|3R
|bgcolor=afeeee|3R
|bgcolor=thistle|F
|
|bgcolor=efefef|0 / 5
|bgcolor=efefef|13–5
|bgcolor=efefef|
|-
|style=text-align:left;background:#efefef|Wimbledon
|A
|A
|A
|Q1
|bgcolor=afeeee|1R
|style=color:#767676|NH
|bgcolor=afeeee|1R
|bgcolor=afeeee|2R
|
|bgcolor=efefef|0 / 3
|bgcolor=efefef|1–3
|bgcolor=efefef|
|-
|style=text-align:left;background:#efefef|US Open
|A
|A
|Q2
|bgcolor=afeeee|1R
|bgcolor=afeeee|1R
|bgcolor=afeeee|3R
|bgcolor=afeeee|2R
|bgcolor=thistle|F
|
|bgcolor=efefef|0 / 5
|bgcolor=efefef|9–5
|bgcolor=efefef|
|- style="font-weight:bold;background:#EFEFEF;"
|style=text-align:left|Win–loss
|0–0
|0–0
|0–0
|2–3
|2–3
|4–3
|6–4
|13–3
|1–1
|0 / 17
|28–17
|
|-
|colspan=12 align=left|Year-end championships
|-
|bgcolor=efefef align=left|ATP Finals
|colspan="6"|did not qualify
|bgcolor=yellow|SF
|bgcolor=thistle|F
|
|bgcolor=efefef|0 / 2
|bgcolor=efefef|5–4
|bgcolor=efefef|
|-
|colspan=12 style=text-align:left|National representation
|-
|style=text-align:left;background:#efefef|Summer Olympics
|style=color:#767676|NH
|A
|colspan=4 style=color:#767676|not held
|A
|colspan=2 style=color:#767676|not held
|bgcolor=efefef|0 / 0
|bgcolor=efefef|0–0
|bgcolor=efefef|
|-
|style=text-align:left;background:#efefef|Davis Cup
|bgcolor=ecf2ff|Z3
|bgcolor=ecf2ff|Z2
|bgcolor=ecf2ff|Z2
|bgcolor=ecf2ff|Z2
|bgcolor=ecf2ff|Z2
|bgcolor=ecf2ff|W1
|bgcolor=ecf2ff|W1
|bgcolor=ecf2ff|W1
|bgcolor=ecf2ff|W1
|bgcolor=efefef|0 / 0
|bgcolor=efefef|18–4
|bgcolor=efefef|
|-
|colspan=12 style=text-align:left|ATP Masters 1000
|-
|bgcolor=efefef align=left|Indian Wells Masters
|A
|A
|A
|Q2
|Q1
|style="color:#767676"|NH
|bgcolor=afeeee|4R
|bgcolor=afeeee|3R
|bgcolor=afeeee|3R
|bgcolor=efefef|0 / 3
|bgcolor=efefef|4–3
|bgcolor=efefef|
|-
|bgcolor=efefef align=left|Miami Open
|A
|Q1
|bgcolor=afeeee|1R
|Q1
|bgcolor=afeeee|1R
|style="color:#767676"|NH
|A
|bgcolor=thistle|F
|
|bgcolor=efefef|0 / 3
|bgcolor=efefef|5–3
|bgcolor=efefef|
|-
|bgcolor=efefef align=left|Monte-Carlo Masters
|A
|A
|bgcolor=afeeee|1R
|A
|A
|style="color:#767676"|NH
|bgcolor=yellow|SF
|bgcolor=afeeee|3R
|
|bgcolor=efefef|0 / 3
|bgcolor=efefef|5–3
|bgcolor=efefef|
|-
|bgcolor=efefef align=left|Madrid Open
|A
|A
|Q1
|A
|Q2
|style="color:#767676"|NH
|bgcolor=yellow|SF
|bgcolor=afeeee|2R
|
|bgcolor=efefef|0 / 2
|bgcolor=efefef|4–2
|bgcolor=efefef|
|-
|bgcolor=efefef align=left|Italian Open
|A
|A
|A
|A
|bgcolor=afeeee|3R
|bgcolor=yellow|SF
|A
|bgcolor=yellow|SF
|
|bgcolor=efefef|0 / 3
|bgcolor=efefef|9–3
|bgcolor=efefef|
|-
|bgcolor=efefef align=left|Canadian Open
|A
|A
|A
|A
|A
|style=color:#767676|NH
|style="background:#ffebcd;"|QF
|bgcolor=yellow|SF
|
|bgcolor=efefef|0 / 2
|bgcolor=efefef|5–2
|bgcolor=efefef|
|-
|bgcolor=efefef align=left|Cincinnati Masters
|A
|A
|A
|A
|bgcolor=afeeee|1R
|bgcolor=afeeee|1R
|style="background:#ffebcd;"|QF
|bgcolor=afeeee|2R
|
|bgcolor=efefef|0 / 4
|bgcolor=efefef|2–4
|bgcolor=efefef|
|-
|bgcolor=efefef align=left|Shanghai Masters
|A
|A
|A
|A
|A
| colspan="3" style="color:#767676" |not held
|
|bgcolor=efefef|0 / 0
|bgcolor=efefef|0–0
|bgcolor=efefef|
|-
|bgcolor=efefef align=left|Paris Masters
|A
|A
|A
|A
|bgcolor=afeeee|1R
|bgcolor=afeeee|1R
|bgcolor=ffebcd|QF
|bgcolor=afeeee|3R
|
|bgcolor=efefef|0 / 4
|bgcolor=efefef|3–4
|bgcolor=efefef|
|- style="font-weight:bold;background:#EFEFEF;"
|style=text-align:left|Win–loss
|0–0
|0–0
|0–2
|0–0
|2–4
|4–3
|16–6
|14–8
|1–1
|0 / 24
|37–24
|
|-
|colspan=12 style=text-align:left|Career statistics
|- style="font-weight:bold;background:#EFEFEF;"
|||2015||2016||2017||2018||2019||2020||2021||2022||2023||colspan=3|Career
|- style="background:#EFEFEF"
|style=text-align:left|Tournaments
|0
|1
|8
|9
|17
|13
|22
|22
|4
|colspan="3"|Career total: 96
|- style="font-weight:bold;background:#EFEFEF;"
|style=text-align:left|Titles
|0
|0
|0
|0
|0
|1
|5
|3
|0
|colspan="3"|Career total: 9
|- style="font-weight:bold;background:#EFEFEF;"
|style=text-align:left|Finals
|0
|0
|0
|0
|1
|2
|5
|7
|0
|colspan="3"|Career total: 16
|- style="background:#EFEFEF"
|style=text-align:left|Hardcourt win–loss
|0–0
|2–3
|2–4
|3–3
|4–10
|5–7
|27–10
|25–13
|4–5
|1 / 46
|72–55
|
|- style="background:#EFEFEF"
|style=text-align:left|Clay win–loss
|0–0
|0–0
|5–5
|5–6
|19–8
|17–6
|28–5
|25–7
|0–0
|8 / 45
|99–37
|
|- style="background:#EFEFEF"
|style=text-align:left|Grass win–loss
|0–0
|0–0
|0–0
|0–0
|0–1
|0–0
|2–2
|1–2
|0–0
|0 / 5
|3–5
|
|- style="font-weight:bold;background:#EFEFEF;"
|style=text-align:left|Overall win–loss
|0–0
|2–3
|7–9
|8–9
|23–19
|22–13
|57–17
|51–22
|4–5
|9 / 96
|174–97
|
|- style="background:#EFEFEF"
|style="text-align:left"|Win (%)
!
!
!
!
!
!
!
!
!
|colspan="3"|Career total: 
|- style="background:#EFEFEF"
|style=text-align:left|Year-end ranking
|1139
|225
|139
|112
|54
|27
|bgcolor=eee8aa|8
|bgcolor="99ccff"|3
|
|colspan="3"|
|}

Doubles

Significant finals
Grand Slam finals
Singles: 2 (2 runner-ups)

Year-end championship finals
Singles: 1 (1 runner-up)

Masters 1000 finals

Singles: 1 (1 runner-up)

ATP career finals

Singles: 15 (9 titles, 6 runner-ups)

ATP Challenger and ITF Futures finals

 Singles: 9 (3 titles, 6 runner-ups) 

Record against other players

Record against top 10 players
Ruud's record against players who have been ranked in the top 10, with those who are active in boldface. Only ATP Tour main draw matches are considered:

Record against players ranked 11–20
Ruud's record against all players who have been ranked 11-20 on the ATP ranking. Only ATP Tour main draw matches are considered:

 Reilly Opelka 4–0
 Benoît Paire 4–0
 Albert Ramos Viñolas 3–3
 Pablo Cuevas 2–0
 Kyle Edmund 1–0
 Marcel Granollers 1–0
 Nick Kyrgios 1–1
 Cristian Garín 1–3
 Nikoloz Basilashvili 0–1
 Borna Ćorić 0–1
 Alex de Minaur 0–1
 Lorenzo Musetti 0–1
 Philipp Kohlschreiber 0–1
 Viktor Troicki 0–1
 Guido Pella 0–2

* Statistics correct as of 12 March 2023.

Wins over top 10 players
He has a  record against players who were, at the time the match was played, ranked in the top 10.

* Statistics correct .

Career Grand Slam statistics

Career Grand Slam seedings
The tournaments won by Ruud are in boldface, and advanced into finals by Ruud are in italics.

 Best Grand Slam results details 
Grand Slam winners are in boldface', and runner-ups are in italics.

 National and international participation 

Team competitions finals: 2 (1 title, 1 runners-up)

 Davis Cup (23–9)

   indicates the result of the Davis Cup match followed by the score, date, place of event, the zonal classification and its phase, and the court surface.

ATP Cup (5–5)

United Cup (1–1) 

 Laver Cup (2–0) 

Longest winning streaks

13 match win streak (2021)

Exhibition matches
Singles (3 wins, 6 losses)

ATP Tour career earnings* Statistics correct .''

Notes

References

Tennis career statistics